Daniel Clarke Eddy (May 21, 1823 – July 26, 1896) was a U.S. clergyman, hymn writer, politician, and author, who in 1855 served as a member, and as the Speaker, of the Massachusetts House of Representatives.

He was the author of The Young Woman's Friend; or the Duties, Trials, Love, Hopes of Woman (1857), in which he argued that women ought to be taught subjects usually only taught to men, including political economy, the sciences, and the practical and theoretical applications of religion, primarily on the basis that women should understand these subjects to be able to educate their sons. He also wrote The Young Man's Friend, the first edition of which sold 10,000 copies.

Selected works

Novels
 (1st series, Lowell, 1849; 2d series, Boston, 1859)

 "The Burman Apostle" (Lowell, 1850)
 "Europa," a book of words (1851)
 "The Percy Family" (5 vols., 1852)
 "Waiter's Tour in the East " (6 vols., Boston, 1861)

 "City Side" (1854)
 "Young Woman's Friend" (1855)
 "Waiting at the Cross" (Boston, 1859)

Travel writings
 Eddy's Travels in Asia and Africa. Boston: Brown, 1893
 Eddy's Travels in Europe. Boston: Brown, 1893. 
 Europe; or, Scenes and Society in England, France, Italy, and Switzerland 1859.

Hymns
 God Is the Seamen's Friend
 God of Nations, Let Salvation Sound
 Sailor Speed Thee o'er the Sea
 We Dedicate to Thee

See also
 76th Massachusetts General Court (1855)

References
 Appletons Encyclopedia

 Julian, John. Dictionary of Hymnology, Second edition. London: J. Murray, 1907.

Baptist writers
Speakers of the Massachusetts House of Representatives
Members of the Massachusetts House of Representatives
People from Boston
Politicians from Salem, Massachusetts
Politicians from Lowell, Massachusetts
Politicians from Fall River, Massachusetts
Politicians from Philadelphia
People from Brooklyn
19th-century American novelists
American travel writers
American Christian hymnwriters
1823 births
1896 deaths
American male novelists
Writers from Salem, Massachusetts
19th-century American male writers
19th-century American politicians
Songwriters from New York (state)
Songwriters from Massachusetts
Novelists from New York (state)
Novelists from Massachusetts
American male non-fiction writers
19th-century Baptists
New Hampton School alumni